Firuzabad (also Romanized as Fīrūzābād) is a village in, and the capital of, Marhemetabad-e Miyani Rural District of Firuzabad District of Chaharborj County, West Azerbaijan province, Iran. At the 2006 National Census, its population was 1,539 in 331 households, when it was in the former Marhemetabad District of Miandoab County. The following census in 2011 counted 1,741 people in 440 households. The latest census in 2016 showed a population of 1,704 people in 508 households. Marhemetabad District was separated from Miandoab County, elevated to the status of Chaharborj County, and divided into two districts in 2020.

References 

Populated places in West Azerbaijan Province